Richard Pinch Bowles (17 August 1864 – 16 June 1960) was a Canadian Methodist minister and university administrator in Ontario, Canada.

Son of George Bowles and Elizabeth Unett (Pinch) Bowles, he was Reverend of Grace Church, Winnipeg and of Sherbourne Street Methodist Church in Toronto, before becoming Professor of Homiletics (1905-1913) at Victoria University in the University of Toronto. Bowles later held the position of President and Chancellor at Victoria University (1913-1930).

References 

Canadian Presbyterian ministers
1861 births
1932 deaths
20th-century Presbyterian ministers
19th-century Presbyterian ministers
People from Northumberland County, Ontario
Academic staff of the University of Toronto